"Get Down" is a song by Belgian DJ Laurent Wéry, from his debut album Ready for the Night. The song was written by SSerge Ramaekers, Chantal Kashala, Laurent Wery. It was released in Belgium as a digital download on 1 March 2010.

Track listing
 Digital download
 "Get Down" (Radio Mix 2) - 2:53
 "Get Down" (Radio Mix 1) - 2:56 
 "Get Down" (NBG Radio Mix) - 3:11 
 "Get Down" (NBG Club Mix) - 6:24
 "Get Down" (Extended Club Mix) - 6:17 
 "Get Down" (X-Tof & Merayah Mix) - 4:59
 "Get Down" (A Capella) - 4:38

Credits and personnel
Producers – Laurent Wery, Sir-G
Lyrics – Serge Ramaekers, Chantal Kashala, Laurent Wery
Label: La Musique du Beau Monde

Chart performance

Release history

References

External links
 Official Website
 Laurent Wery on Facebook

2010 singles
Laurent Wéry songs
2010 songs
Songs written by Laurent Wéry